Michael Molcher is a British journalist and magazine editor, who is originally from Leeds. He also produced the small press magazine The End Is Nigh.

His current work is as a freelance features writer for 2000 AD, the Judge Dredd Megazine and Comic Heroes, for which he has interviewed some of the most notable artists and writers from the British comic industry. He also wrote a piece for the 30th anniversary issue of 2000 AD.

Bibliography

Feature writing

As well as a lot of uncredited writing in The End Is Nigh, his feature writing includes:

 "A Very English Apocalypse" (interview with Alan Moore, illustrated by Frazer Irving, in The End Is Nigh #2, 2005)
2000AD features:
 "Tharg's Big Breaks" (Prog 1526) - 30th anniversary issue feature, looking at the many 2000AD readers who have gone on to be artists and writers for the comic
Judge Dredd Megazine features:
 Alan Moore (Meg 246)
 Kevin O'Neill (Meg 248)
 Mick McMahon (Meg 256)
 Pat Mills (Meg 261)
 Simon Spurrier (Meg 263)
 John Hicklenton (Meg 264)
 Simon Davis (Meg 265)
 Dave Taylor (Meg 270)
 Frazer Irving (Meg 272)
 Peter Doherty (Meg 273)
 Jock (Meg 274)
 Greg Staples (Meg 279)
 John Higgins (Meg 281)
 Colin Wilson (Meg 284)
 Richard Elson (Meg 285)
 John Cooper (Meg 286)
 Ron Smith (Megs 288 to 289)
 Dom Reardon (Meg 295)
 Jesus Redondo (Meg 296)
 Dave Gibbons (Megs 297 to 298)
 Carlos Ezquerra (Megs 300 to 302)
Obituaries:
 "Belardinelli - Loving the Alien" (Meg 259, 2007) - obituary of Massimo Bellardinelli
Comic Heroes features:
 Interview with Hellboy artist Guy Davis in issue one
 Interview with Alan Moore in issue two 
 Interview with Sean Phillips in issue three

External links
The End is Nigh home page
2000 AD profile

References

British male journalists
British comics artists
British magazine editors
Year of birth missing (living people)
Living people